Golden orb may refer to:

 Rotundaria aurea, a species of freshwater mussel
 Golden orb spiders
 Maya the Bee: The Golden Orb
 Golden Orb, a winning horse of 1911 R J Peters Stakes race (Australia)
 Golden Orb, a winning horse of 1920 Wokingham Stakes race (Great Britain), trained by Jack Jarvis
 The Golden Orb, a 2001 novel by Douglas Niles as part of the Icewall trilogy of the Dragonlance novel series
 A gold-coloured spherical object, used in popular culture, like "Part 3" (Twin Peaks) and Dragon Quest V